The voiceless velar affricate is a type of consonantal sound, used in some spoken languages. The tie bar may be omitted, yielding  in the IPA and kx in X-SAMPA.

Some languages have the voiceless pre-velar affricate, which is articulated slightly more front compared with the place of articulation of the prototypical voiceless velar affricate, though not as front as the prototypical voiceless palatal affricate - see that article for more information.

Conversely, some languages have the voiceless post-velar affricate, which is articulated slightly behind the place of articulation of the prototypical voiceless velar affricate, though not as back as the prototypical voiceless uvular affricate - see that article for more information.

Features
Features of the voiceless velar affricate:

Occurrence

See also
 Index of phonetics articles

Notes

References

External links
 

Velar consonants
Pulmonic consonants
Voiceless oral consonants
Central consonants